NTV Plus is the brand name for the Russian digital satellite television service from NTV, transmitted from Eutelsat's W4 satellite at 36.0°E and from Bonum 1 at 56.0°E. Previously a part of Vladimir Gusinsky's media empire (Media Most holding), now it is included in the Gazprom Media holding.

Milestones
1996 - First broadcasts of NTV-Plus appeared on September 1, 1996
1997 - Since early in the year the channels were broadcast in encoded form.
1998 -  On November 22 NTV-Plus started satellite TV broadcasting.
1999 - In February NTV-Plus switched from an analogue to digital broadcasting system allowing the expansion of the number of channels from five to fifty. In December NTV-Plus started re-broadcasting digital channels in two languages.
2000 - On May 25 another Eutelsat-W4 satellite was put into orbit allowing the expansion of the broadcasting area.
2005 - Beginning of Dolby Digital 5.1 broadcasting
2006 - Broadcasting begins in Ukraine territory
2007 - Broadcasting in HDTV started
2017 - Broadcasting in 4K/UHD started
2022 - The Denis Diderot Committee, a European group of professional and academics researchers and professionals ask sanctions against NTV Plus for having cancelled various international news channels from its line-up.

Channels

Variety, entertainment

 WWE Network
 W Network
 TVPolonia
 Telekanal Dozhd
 Channel One Russia (Perviy Kanal) (SD/HD)
 Russia-1 (Rossiya 1) (SD/HD)
 NTV (НТВ) (SD/HD)
 Petersburg - Channel 5 (SD)
 Russia K
 OTR
 REN TV (SD)
 STS
 TNT (SD/HD)
 TNT4 (SD)
 TV3 (SD)
 TV Centr
 Telekanal Domashny
 Peretz
 Friday!
 U (TV channel, Russia)
 2×2
 Telekanal Zvezda
 TNV Planeta (Tartastan)
 TDK
 Psychologia21
 Spas
 Mir
 Kukhnia TV
 NTV Plus Infokanal
 Nostalgia
 STV (TV channel, Russia)
 Kuban 24 Orbita
Love Nature
 Telecafe
 8 Kanal
 Mama

Sports

 Match TV (SD/HD)
 Match Nash Sport
 Match Arena (SD/HD)
 Match Game
 Match Igra (SD/HD)
 Match Planeta
 Match Futbol 1
 Match Futbol 2
 Match Futbol 3
 Match TV Horse World
 Our Football
 NTV Plus Sport Tsentr
 NTV Plus Sport Urals
 NTV Plus Sport Sibir
 NTV Plus Sport Dalniy Vostok     
 Eurosport 1 (SD/HD)
 Eurosport 2 (HD)
 Extreme Sports Channel (SD)
 Telekanal Russian Extreme
 Boyets
 KHL-TV (SD/HD)
 Viasat Sport
 Boytsovskiy klub
 TEN 1
 TEN 2
 TEN 3
 TEN 4
 TEN 2 HD
 TEN Action

News

 Arirang Asia
 Euronews (SD)
 KBS Asia
 NHK Asia
 Mir 24 (SD)
 Moskva 24 (SD)
 Russia 24 (SD)
 RBC TV (SD)
 Perviy Meteo (SD)
 Russia Today
 RT Arabic
 RT en Español
 RT America
 RT UK
 RT France
 RTD

International

 Armenia TV (SD)

Movies

 NTV Plus Premiera
 NTV Plus KinoHit
 NTV Plus Kinoklub
 NTV Plus Kino+
 NTV Plus Nashe Kino
 NTV Plus Nashe Novoe Kino
 NTV Plus Kino Soyuz
 Teleklub
 Dom Kino
 Komedia Telekanal
 Mnogo TV
 CBS Drama
 CBS Justice
 CBS Europa
 E! Russia
 MGM Channel
 Fox (Russia) (SD/HD)
 Fox Life Russia (SD)
 FX Russia HD
 Paramount Channel Russia (SD)
 Paramount Comedy Russia (SD)
 TV1000
 TV1000 Russkoe Kino
 TV1000 Action
 Russkij Illusion
 Illusion +
 Eurokino
 TV XXI (SD)
 AMEDIA 1
 AMEDIA 2
 AMEDIA Premium

Music

 Muzika Pervogo
 Telekanal La Minor
 TNT Music (SD)
 MTV Russia (SD)
 MTV Dance (SD)
 MTV Hits (SD)
 MTV Rocks (SD)
 VH1 Europe (SD)
 VH1 Classic Europe (SD)
 MCM Top (SD)
 Mezzo TV (SD/HD)
 Bridge TV
 RuSong TV
 Europa Plus TV
 Muz-TV
 Music Now
 9X0
 9XM
 B4U Music
 M Tune

Kids

Boomerang (SD)
Cartoon Network (SD)
Detski Mir (SD)
Detskiy (SD)
Disney Channel (SD)
Duck TV (SD)
Gulli Girl (SD)
JimJam (SD)
Karusel (SD)
Mult (SD)
Nickelodeon (HD/SD)
Nick Jr. (SD)
Telekanal O! (SD)
TiJi (SD)
Tlum (HD)

Documentary

 Animal Planet (Europe)
 24 Dok
 365 Dnei TV
 Auto Plus
 Da Vinci Learning
 Discovery Channel Russia
 Discovery Science
 Discovery World Russia (Replaced by DTX Russia)
 Domashnie zhivotnye
 Istoriya (SD/HD)
 History
 Interesnoe TV
 Investigation Discovery Russia
 Kto Est' Kto
 My Planet
 National Geographic Channel (Russia)
 Nat Geo Wild (Russia)
 Nauka 2.0
 Ocean-TV
 Outdoor Channel
 RT Documentary
 Russian Travel Guide (SD)
 Soversheno Sekretno
 TLC (Russia)
 Viasat Explore
 Viasat History
 Viasat Nature
 Vremya
 Ohota i Rybalka
 Prosveschenie
 Perviy Obrazovatelniy

Pay-per-view

 Kinoreys 1
 Kinoreys 2

HD

 HD Sport
 Discovery HD
 Animal Planet HD
 TLC HD
 HD Kino
 HD Life
 MTV Live HD
 Nat Geo Wild HD
 Mezzo Live HD
 NTV Plus 3D
 NTV Plus Football 1
 NTV Plus Football 2
 NTV Plus Football 3
 Nash Futbol
 Nickelodeon HD
 Perviy Kanal HD
 Russia HD
 History HD
 AMEDIA Premium HD

4K/UHD

Fashion 4K
Home 4K

Ukraine only

 Perviy Kanal Ukraina
 RTR Planeta
 NTN (Channel)
 NTV Mir

Adult

Hustler TV (SD)
Nuart TV (SD)
Russkaya Noch (SD)
Playboy TV (SD)

Radio

AvtoRadio
Business FM
Comedy Radio
Detskoe Radio
DFM 101.2
Echo of Moscow
Hit FM
Humor FM
Love Radio
Militseyskaya Volna
NRJ Russia
Radio Chanson
Radio Dlya Dvoih
Radio Komsomolskaya Pravda
Radio Romantika
Radio Maximum
Radio Mir
Radio Vanya
Relax FM
Russkoye Radio

High-definition television (HDTV) 
Starting from 2007, NTV Plus offers high-definition television (HDTV) programming. The following channels are offered: HD Kino (cinema), HD Sport (sports), HD Life (nature & travel), Eurosport HD, Discovery HD, MTV/Nickelodeon HD, National Geographics HD (nature), Mezzo Live HD (classical and jazz music).

The content is either produced by NTV Plus itself or received from foreign partners. The programming is delivered in 1080i25 format using H.264/MPEG-4 AVC codec with 10 Mbit/s data rate. NTV Plus has contracted with France's Thomson to manufacture the receivers that accept signal encoded in MPEG-4.

References

External links 
Official Site 
NTV Plus Ukraine 
Channel and transponder list

Direct broadcast satellite services
Television networks in Russia
Mass media companies of Russia
Television channels and stations established in 1996